Wendy Sessions is a British ice dancer. She won the 1977 World Junior Figure Skating Championships with partner Mark Reed. She won the 1980 Nebelhorn Trophy with partner Stephen Williams.

Results
(with Stephen Williams, except World Juniors with Mark Reed)

References

Navigation

British female ice dancers
Living people
World Junior Figure Skating Championships medalists
Year of birth missing (living people)